Abbey Nunatak is a nunatak  southeast of Penrod Nunatak, lying at the west side of Reedy Glacier just north of the mouth of Kansas Glacier. Mapped by United States Geological Survey (USGS) from surveys and U.S. Navy air photos, 1960–64. It was named by Advisory Committee on Antarctic Names (US-ACAN) for Gordon Abbey, radioman with the Byrd Station winter party, 1957.

Nunataks of Wilkes Land